Hekimhan  is a town and district of Malatya Province of Turkey. The mayor is Turan Karadağ (CHP). It is located in the upper Euphrates in Eastern Anatolia. The district population is 25,629. Hekimhan is 1,075 m above sea level. The highest point in Hekimhan is Zurbahan mountain (2,091 m).

Historical sites 
Taşhan caravanserai (constructed by the Seljuk Turks), a Turkish bath and a mosque built by the Ottomans are some notable historical structures in the town.

Settlements

Notable people 
 Mehmet Ali Ağca

References

Populated places in Malatya Province
Districts of Malatya Province